Carter Wilson is an American novelist and short-fiction writer based in Erie, Colorado. He is best known for his works of domestic and psychological suspense. Wilson is an author of eight books.

Biography
Wilson was born in New Mexico and grew up in Los Angeles, California. He attended Cornell University in New York, where he received his B.S. degree in 1992. Since 1996, Wilson has been living with his family in Boulder, Colorado metropolitan area.

Literary career
Wilson began writing in 2003. His first novel Final Crossing was published in 2012. Wilson's third novel, The Comfort of Black, made the USA Today bestseller chart, and won several book awards and nominations, including Colorado Book Award in the Thriller category.  His works have been noted and reviewed by various publications and literary critics, including Kirkus Reviews, Publishers Weekly, Library Journal, and The Denver Post, among others. Two of his novels take place in the fictional town of Bury, NH.

Wilson also hosts the Making It Up video podcast in which he and other writers discuss the craft of writing and their publishing experiences.

Published works
The New Neighbor (2022)
The Dead Husband (2021)
The Dead Girl in 2A (2019)
Mister Tender's Girl (2018)
Revelation (2017)
The Comfort of Black (2015)
The Boy in the Woods (2014)
Final Crossing (2012)

Translations
German translations: Revelation (Das Letzte Bekenntnis), The Comfort of Black (Das Dunkel der Shuld) 
Polish translations: The Comfort of Black (Pokusa Czerni), The Boy in the Woods (Chlopiec w lesie)
Czech translations: The Boy in the Woods (Chlapec v lese)

Literary awards
Colorado Book Awards winner in 2016, 2017, 2019 and 2020

References

1970 births
Living people
21st-century American novelists
American thriller writers
Cornell University alumni
Novelists from Colorado
American horror writers